Alberto Armijo Pujol (27 September 1926 – 9 August 2021) was a Costa Rican football striker.

Club career
Nicknamed El Gallego, Armijo was born in Nicoya, Guanacaste Province, but moved to San José when he was young and played in the junior leagues with Saprissa. He made his senior debut for Orión and was the league's top goalscorer twice, in 1950 with 25 goals for Universidad and in 1961 with 16 goals for Cartaginés.

International career
He also played for Costa Rica at three CCCF Championships, the 1950 Central American and Caribbean Games and the 1951 Pan American Games. He earned a total of 16 caps, scoring 6 goals.

Basketball
Armijo also was a basketball player, playing for Seminario E. L. and Orión.

Personal life
Armijo was married and had 4 children. After his football career he worked at the Banco Nacional and Banco Central de Costa Rica.

He died on 9 August 2021, aged 94.

References

External links
 Alberto Armijo Pujol (Bio) - Nación 
 Alberto Armijo Pujol (GALLEGO)  - Salon de la Fama del Deporte Costarricense (Costa Rican Sports Hall of Fame)

1926 births
2021 deaths
People from Guanacaste Province
Association football forwards
Costa Rican footballers
Costa Rica international footballers
C.F. Universidad de Costa Rica footballers
C.S. Cartaginés players
Liga FPD players
Costa Rican men's basketball players
Pan American Games silver medalists for Costa Rica
Pan American Games medalists in football
Competitors at the 1950 Central American and Caribbean Games
Footballers at the 1951 Pan American Games
Medalists at the 1951 Pan American Games